Clarkson-Knowles Cottage is a historic home located at Potsdam in St. Lawrence County, New York.  It was built about 1835 and is a -story, five-bay residence constructed of red Potsdam Sandstone in the slab and binder style.

It was listed on the National Register of Historic Places in 1995.

References

Houses on the National Register of Historic Places in New York (state)
Federal architecture in New York (state)
Houses completed in 1835
Houses in St. Lawrence County, New York
National Register of Historic Places in St. Lawrence County, New York